Aimo Allan Koivunen, (17 October 1917 – 12 August 1989) was a Finnish soldier in the Continuation War and the first documented case of a soldier overdosing on methamphetamine during combat.

Early life 
Aimo Allan Koivunen was born in Alastaro, Grand Duchy of Finland on 17 October 1917 to Frans Vihtori Koivunen and Aune Sofia Koivunen, they had six children, Aimo was the eldest.

Experience during the Continuation War
Koivunen was a Finnish soldier, assigned to a ski patrol on 20 April 1944, along with several other Finnish soldiers. Three days into their mission, on 18 March, the group was attacked and surrounded by Soviet forces, from whom they were able to escape. Koivunen became fatigued after skiing for a long distance, but could not stop. He was carrying his patrol's entire supply of army-issued Pervitin, or methamphetamine, a stimulant used to remain awake while on duty. He consumed the entire supply of Pervitin, and had a short burst of energy, but soon entered a state of delirium, and eventually lost consciousness. Koivunen later recalled waking up the following morning, separated from his patrol, and having no supplies. In the following days, he escaped Soviet forces once again, was injured by a land mine, and lay in a ditch for a week, waiting for help. Having skied more than 400 km (248.5 mi) he was found and admitted to a nearby hospital, where his heart rate was measured at 200 beats per minute, which is double the average human heartbeat, and weighing only 43 kg (94.8 lbs). In the week that Koivunen was gone, he subsisted only on pine buds and a single Siberian jay that he caught, and ate raw. He was found, and survived, until he died in 1989 at the age of 71.

References 

1917 births
1989 deaths
Finnish soldiers
People of the Winter War
Finnish military personnel of World War II
Psychoactive drugs and the military
Methamphetamine and health